Alpheus B. Colton (1831–1887) was a state representative in Minnesota's 20th district. Colton was born in Vermont in 1831 and moved to Minnesota in 1855. Colton worked as a farmer in Winnebago City. He was elected to the Minnesota House of Representatives on November 5, 1867, and served Cottonwood, Faribault, Jackson, Martin, Murray, Pipestone, and Rock counties for one year. He was preceded by A. Andrews and succeeded by James W. Hunter. Colton was the chair of the elections committee and also served on the state prison and towns and counties committees.

References

1831 births
1887 deaths
People from Winnebago, Minnesota
Republican Party members of the Minnesota House of Representatives
19th-century American politicians